Ilays National University (INU), is a university in Las Anod, Somaliland.  The university was established by Prof. Tungub, who at first set up the Ilays Educational Academy. INU was officially formed in 2012 with the purpose of providing higher education to the graduates of the academy and the residents of Sool, Sanaag and Ayn regions.
The university is taught by teachers from outside the country, along with native Somali lecturers.

References

External links
  Official Website
 Jaamacadda Ilays oo laga daah furay Laascaanood, Horufadhimedia.com, 11 September 2015
 Jaamacad loogu Magac-daray Ilays oo laga furay Magaalada Laascaanood ee G/Sool, www.Hiiraan.com, 11 September 2015

Universities in Somalia
2012 establishments in Somalia
Educational institutions established in 2012
Las Anod